Adrenalin...Heart is a two-hander play written by Georgia Fitch.

Overview
A two character play about Leigh, a British, white, Catholic single mother with two children and a job in local government, and Angel, a black man that has done time at college and in jail and now deals drugs in Islington.

References

External links
Goodreads
Google Books

2002 plays
British plays
Two-handers